Lesbos or Lesvos is a Greek island located in the northeastern Aegean Sea. It is separated from Asia Minor by the narrow Mytilini Strait. On the southeastern coast is the island's capital and largest city, Mytilene, whose name is also used as a moniker for the whole island. Lesbos is a separate regional unit with the seat in Mytilene, which is also the capital of the larger North Aegean region. The region includes the islands of Lesbos, Chios, Ikaria, Lemnos, and Samos. The total population of the island is 83,068. A third of Lesbians live in the capital, while the remainder are concentrated in small towns and villages. The largest are Plomari, Kalloni, the Gera Villages, Agiassos, Eresos, and Molyvos (the ancient Mythimna).

According to later Greek writers, Mytilene was founded in the 11th century BC by the family Penthilidae, who arrived from Thessaly and ruled the city-state until a popular revolt (590–580 BC) led by Pittacus of Mytilene ended their rule. In fact, the archaeological and linguistic record may indicate a late Iron Age arrival of Greek settlers although references in Late Bronze Age Hittite archives indicate a likely Greek presence then. The name Mytilene itself seems to be of Hittite origin. According to Homer's Iliad, Lesbos was part of the kingdom of Priam, which was based in Anatolia. Much work remains to be done to determine just what happened and when. In the Middle Ages, it was under Byzantine and then Genoese rule. Lesbos was conquered by the Ottoman Empire in 1462. The Ottomans then ruled the island until the First Balkan War in 1912, when it became part of the Kingdom of Greece.

The island is widely known as the home of the ancient Greek poet Sappho, from whose association with homosexuality the word lesbian derives its modern meaning. It is also sometimes called the "Island of the Poets".

Etymology

The traditional English form Lesbos (pronounced , also ) comes from Ancient Greek. In Greece, it is often referred to as Mytilene, after its capital.

History

Prehistory
Lesbos has been inhabited since at least 3000 BC. The oldest artifacts found on the island may date to the late Paleolithic period. Important archaeological sites on the island are the Neolithic cave of Kagiani, probably a refuge for shepherds, the Neolithic settlement of Chalakies, and the extensive habitation of Thermi (3000–1000 BC). The largest habitation is found in Lisvori, dating back to 2800–1900 BC, part of which is submerged in shallow coastal waters. It is also thought that Pelasgians, Archaeans and Aeolians chronologically lived on the island between 1507 BC and 1100 BC.

Ancient and classical era

According to Classical Greek mythology, Lesbos was the patron god of the island. Macareus of Rhodes was reputedly the first king whose many daughters bequeathed their names to some of the present larger towns. In Classical myth his sister, Canace, was killed to have him made king. 

The place names with female origins are claimed by some to be much earlier settlements named after local goddesses, who were replaced by gods; however, there is little evidence to support this. Homer refers to the island as "Macaros edos", the seat of Macar. Hittite records from the Late Bronze Age name the island Lazpa and must have considered its population significant enough to allow the Hittites to "borrow their Gods" (presumably idols) to cure their king when the local gods were not forthcoming. It is believed that emigrants from mainland Greece, mainly from  Thessaly, entered the island in the Late Bronze Age and bequeathed it with the Aeolic dialect of the Greek language, whose written form survives in the poems of Sappho, amongst others. 

In classical times, the cities of the island formed a pentapolis, comprising Mytilene, Methymna, Antissa, Eresos, and Pyrrha. Pyrrha was destroyed in an earthquake in 231 BC, and Antissa by the Roman Republic in 168 BC.

Two of the nine lyric poets in the Ancient Greek canon, Sappho and Alcaeus, were from Lesbos. Phanias wrote history. The seminal artistic creativity of those times brings to mind the myth of Orpheus to whom Apollo gave a lyre and the Muses taught to play and sing. When Orpheus incurred the wrath of the god Dionysus he was dismembered by the Maenads and of his body parts his head and his lyre found their way to Lesbos where they have "remained" ever since. Pittacus was one of the Seven Sages of Greece. In classical times, Hellanicus advanced historiography and Theophrastus, the father of botany, succeeded Aristotle as the head of the Lyceum. Aristotle and Epicurus lived there for some time, and it is there that Aristotle began systematic zoological investigations.

Theophanes, the historian who recorded Pompey's campaigns, wrote the famous novel Daphnis and Chloe, was also from Lesbos. 

The abundant grey pottery ware found on the island and the worship of Cybele, the great mother-goddess of Anatolia, suggest the cultural continuity of the population from Neolithic times. When the Persian king Cyrus the Great defeated Croesus (546 BC) the Ionic Greek cities of Anatolia and the adjacent islands became Persian subjects and remained such until the Persians were defeated by the Greeks at the Battle of Salamis (480 BC). The island was governed by an oligarchy in archaic times, followed by quasi-democracy in classical times. Around this time, Arion developed the type of poem called dithyramb, the progenitor of tragedy, and Terpander invented the seven note musical scale for the lyre. For a short period it was a member of the Athenian confederacy, its apostasy from which is recounted by Thucydides in the Mytilenian Debate, in Book III of his History of the Peloponnesian War. In Hellenistic times, the island belonged to various Successor kingdoms until 79 BC when it passed into Roman hands. Remnants of its Roman medieval history are three impressive castles.

The cities of Mytilene and Methymna have been bishoprics since the 5th century. By the early 10th century, Mytilene had been raised to the status of a metropolitan see. Methymna achieved the same by the 12th century.

Middle Ages and Byzantine era
During the Middle Ages, Lesbos belonged to the Byzantine Empire. In 802, the Byzantine Empress Irene was exiled to Lesbos after her deposition, and died there. The island served as a gathering base for the fleet of the rebel Thomas the Slav in the early 820s. In the late 9th century, it was heavily raided by the Emirate of Crete. As a result, the inhabitants of Eresos abandoned their town and settled in Mount Athos. In –1093, the island was briefly occupied by the Seljuk Turkish emir Tzachas, ruler of Smyrna, but he was unable to capture Methymna, which resisted throughout. In the 12th century, the island became a frequent target for plundering raids by the Republic of Venice.

After the Fourth Crusade (1202–1204) the island passed to the Latin Empire, but was reconquered by the Empire of Nicaea sometime after 1224. In 1354, it was granted as a dowry and fief to the Genoese Francesco I Gattilusio by  the Byzantine emperor John V Palaiologos. The Gattilusio family ruled the island for over a century, engaging in fortifications at the Castle of Mytilene, Molyvos (ancient Methymna), and the fort of Agios Theodoros at the site of ancient Antissa.

Ottoman era

After the Fall of Constantinople in 1453, the Gattilusi continued to rule Lesbos as tributary vassals to the Ottoman Empire, until the island was conquered by Sultan Mehmed II in September 1462. After the capture of Lesbos, the richer inhabitants were moved to Constantinople in order to repopulate the city, some boys and girls were taken away into imperial service, but the rest of the population remained. Mehmed II brought in Muslim settlers from Rumelia and Anatolia, and encouraged his Janissaries to settle there and take local wives. Among them was Yakub, the father of the pirate admiral Hayreddin Barbarossa. Mytilene and Molova (the Turkish name for Molyvos/Methymna) became seats of kadis, and the cathedral of Mytilene was converted into a mosque. Otherwise the organization of the local Orthodox church was not altered.

In 1464, as part of the First Ottoman–Venetian War, the Venetians under Orsato Giustiniani occupied the fort of Agios Theodoros, but failed to capture the rest of the island, and destroyed the castle upon their withdrawal. Another attack occurred in 1474, when the Venetians under Pietro Mocenigo raided the island. During the Second Ottoman–Venetian War, a Venetian-led fleet of 200 ships besieged Mytilene, but the attack was defeated by Şehzade Korkut. His father, Sultan Bayezid II, then reinforced the Castle of Mytilene with artillery bastions.

The large majority of the island's population remained Greek Christian, although there was a sizeable Muslim community, formed from both immigrants and converts; from 7.4% of households in 1488, it rose to a peak of 19.45% in 1831 before starting to decline in relative terms, reaching 14% in 1892. The peak of the Islamization process occurred between 1602 and 1644 The Muslims lived throughout the island. Relations between the two communities were generally good, and Lesbians were often bilingual in both Greek and Turkish. During Ottoman rule, the compulsory devshirme system was implemented into the island, where the locals including Muslim landowners and the state representatives negotiated enlisting their teenagers into the Ottoman military by preventing some boys from being levied and sneaking others into the levied groups. For example, in the winter between 1603 and 1604, 105 boys were levied from the island and Lesvos was the only Island that the levy was implemented on the levy of this period. 

Lesbos prospered from trade, and Mytilene was considered the busiest port in the Aegean Sea. West European representatives are attested in the city already in 1700, acting as vice-consuls for the consulates in Smyrna. The island exported olives and olive oil, wheat, grapes, raisins and wine, figs, fish, dairy products, acorns, soap, leather and hides, pitch and livestock. Mytilene itself increased five-fold in population during the Ottoman period. A number of new mosques were erected in the city, and Barbaros Kayreddin built a madrasa, dervish lodge, and imaret erected in his home town. Many of the early Ottoman buildings, as well as the city walls, were destroyed in the earthquake of 1867. Mevlevi and Bektashi lodges are attested, since 1544 for the former, and since 1699 for the latter. Molyvos, which was the island's second city for most of the Ottoman period, also experienced growth, doubling in size; unlike Mytilene, the Muslim element came to predominate, and comprised over half the population by 1874. Mosques were built and fortifications undertaken during the long Cretan War (1645–1669) with Venice. But during the 19th century, the town declined rapidly in importance and number of inhabitants, a decline which continued to modern times. In the mid-18th century, the castle and settlement of Sigri were established to protect the western coast from pirate attacks. 

 
The relative prosperity of the island—wealth was apparently concentrated among the Greek Christian bourgeoisie rather than the Muslim community—contributed to the island not taking part in the Greek War of Independence in 1821–1929. During the second half of the 19th century, this prosperity became evident in the construction of large and ornamented mansions and churches; the Muslims followed suit, employing the fashionable Neo-Classical and Neo-Gothic styles in their own renovations of their mosques, especially after the destructive 1867 earthquake. The Ottoman writer and liberal politician Namık Kemal served in the local administration in 1877–1884. In 1905, four European powers seized the customs and telegraph offices in the island to pressure the Ottoman government to accept their plan for an international commission that would supervise the provinces of Macedonia.

Modern era

In 1912, the First Balkan War broke out between Greece, Bulgaria, Serbia and Montenegro, and the Ottoman Empire over the independence and expansion of Christian Balkan states. Under Rear Admiral Pavlos Kountouriotis, Greek naval forces landed at Lesbos on 21 November 1912, commencing the Battle of Lesbos. Kountouriotis sent an ultimatum to secure Mytilene under Greece, which Ottoman officials agreed to, before fleeing the city. The operation to annex the rest of the island was placed under Colonel Apollodoros Syrmakezis. Syrmakezis led 3,175 troops towards an Ottoman camp in Filia, reaching the outskirts of the city on 19 December, with an attack planned for the following morning. However, Ottoman military commanders approached Syrmakezis with a request for an armistice and Ottoman surrender was finalised on 21 December 1912, a month after the commencement of the battle. Nine Greek troops were killed and 81 were injured during the battle. The following year, the Ottoman Empire denied their previous agreement to cede Lesbos to Greece, until the Treaty of London.

In the Greco-Turkish population exchange that followed World War I and the Greco-Turkish War of 1919–1922, the local Muslims left the island and Lesbos returned to a fully Christian population as it had been before Ottoman occupation. In 1922, many Greek refugees of the war and the concurrent Greek Genocide settled in Lesbos. These refugees were mostly women and children as the men were either fighting or had died in battle. A statue of a mother cradling her children named the "Statue of the Asia Minor Mother" was donated by the refugees and erected in Mytilene. Twenty years later, during World War II, Nazi Germany conducted an invasion of Greece and Yugoslavia, with both being defeated in 1941 and subsequently divided between the Axis Powers. Lesbos was annexed into Germany until 10 September 1944, when Greece was liberated.

The poet Odysseus Elytis, the descendant of an old family of Lesbos, received the Nobel Prize in Literature in 1979.

Tourism

Lesbos is known to be one of the Greek island touristic hotspots, especially during its tourism season of April, May, June and July. Mytilene airport management recorded 47,379 tourists visiting Lesbos in its 2015 tourism season. The refugee crisis has since slowed down tourism to the island, with a 67.89% decrease rate from June 2015 to June 2016. 6,841 Europeans on 47 flights arrived in Lesbos during its 2016 tourism season, compared to July the previous year, which saw 18,373 Europeans fly to the island on 130 flights. 94 cruise ships full of tourists arrived in Lesbos in 2011 and only one in 2018. Of the refugee crisis' impact on tourism, Maria Dimitriou, a local shop owner from Mithymna, said, "2015 was a very good year for tourism and then, suddenly they started to arrive. The refugees began arriving in mid-July, when the hotels were full of tourists. There were refugees everywhere, lying down with all their trash. And after this, tourism stopped."

In 2019, the head of the Lesbos chamber of commerce, Vangelis Mirsinias, told The Jakarta Post that the island's administration is trying to "woo back the tourists" and they "want to remind people of how beautiful" Lesbos is." He advocated for the European Union to help in advertising and also said, "The economy is still paying the impact of the crisis. It will need time and money to change this image." Lesbos is also a hotspot for Dutch tourists and one Dutch tourist said that tourism had halted because people "did not feel like seeing all this misery" of the refugees. One local told the publication that residents had become "fed up" and "people are angry towards the government and towards Europe: they told us not to worry, the camps won't last. But it's still there", whilst another business owner explained that he had lost a third of his business and "blames all the negative media attention" for the lack of tourists. The Jakarta Post also reported that tourists have increased in numbers in recent years, with 63,000 arriving in 2018. The COVID-19 pandemic has also damaged the island's tourism industry.

In April 2022, the Greek government announced a dedication of €2 million in restoring tourism in Lesbos and four other islands. In October 2022, it was announced that Lesbos would return to the cruise ship industry. Konstantinos Moutzouris, the governor of the North Aegean Region, which Lesbos is under, explained that the region's administration will run a study "in order to develop cruise tourism on the island." The deputy governor of tourism, Nikolaos Nyktas, believed that the cruise industry "suits the island and its culture", while the head of development for the project, Ioannis Bras, said that the island could "offer a lot to the cruise market".

In English and most other European languages, including Greek, the term lesbian is commonly used to refer to homosexual women. This use of the term derives from the poems of Sappho, who was born in Lesbos and who wrote with powerful emotional content directed toward other women.  Due to this association, the town of Eresos, her birthplace, is visited frequently by LGBT tourists.

Geography

In late Palaeolithic/Mesolithic times it was joined to the Anatolian mainland before the end of the Last Glacial Period.

The shape of the island is roughly triangular, but it is deeply intruded by the gulfs of Kalloni, with an entry on the southern coast, and of Gera, in the southeast.

The island's volcanic origin is manifested in several hot springs and the two gulfs.

Lesbos is verdant, aptly named Emerald Island, with a greater variety of flora than expected for the island's size. Eleven million olive trees cover 40% of the island together with other fruit trees. Forests of Mediterranean pines, chestnut trees and some oaks occupy 20%, and the remainder is scrub, grassland or urban.

Climate 
The island has a hot-summer Mediterranean climate (Csa in the Köppen climate classification). Its exceptional sunshine makes it one of the sunniest islands in the Aegean Sea. Snow and very low temperatures are rare.

Geology

The entire territory of Lesbos is "Lesvos Geopark", which is a member of the European Geoparks Network (since 2000) and Global Geoparks Network (since 2004) on account of its outstanding geological heritage, educational programs and projects, and promotion of geotourism.

This geopark was enlarged from former "Lesvos Petrified Forest Geopark". Lesbos contains one of the few known petrified forests, called Petrified forest of Lesbos, and it has been declared a Protected Natural Monument. Fossilised plants have been found in many localities on the western part of the island. The fossilised forest was formed during the Late Oligocene to Lower–Middle Miocene, as determined by the intense volcanic activity in the area. Neogene volcanic rocks dominate the central and western part of the island, comprising andesites, dacites and rhyolites, ignimbrite, pyroclastics, tuffs, and volcanic ash. The products of the volcanic activity covered the vegetation of the area and the fossilization process took place during favourable conditions. The fossilized plants are silicified remnants of a sub-tropical forest that existed on the northwest part of the island 20–15 million years ago.

Landmarks

Petrified forest of Lesbos
Catholic Church of Theotokos, where part of the relics of Saint Valentine are kept
Castle of Molyvos (Mithymna)
Castle of Mytilene
Castle of Sigri
Church of Panagia Agiasos
Monastery of Agios Raphael
Monastery of Taxiarchis
Roman Aqueduct of Lesbos (Mória)
The Bridge at Kremasti
Early Christian Basilica of Agios Andreas in Eressos
Temple of Klopedi
Christian Temple of Chalinados
Ancient Sanctuary of Messa
Acropolis of Ancient Pyrra
Monastery of Ipsilou
Monastery of Limonas
Statue of Liberty (Mytilene)
Ouzo Museum "The World of Ouzo" in Plomari
Barbayannis Ouzo Museum (Plomari)
The Mosque in Parakila
Catacomb of Mary Magdalene
Sourlangas Leather Factory

Endangered sites

Twelve historic churches on the island were listed together on the 2008 World Monuments Fund's Watch List of the 100 Most Endangered Sites in the world.  The churches range in date from the Early Christian Period to the 19th century.  Exposure to the elements, outmoded conservation methods, and increased tourism are all threats to the structures.  The following are the 12 churches:

Katholikon of Moni Perivolis
Early Christian Basilica Agios Andreas Eressos
Early Christian Basilica Afentelli Eressos
Church of Agios Stephanos Mantamados
Katholikon of Moni Taxiarchon Kato Tritos
Katholikon of Moni Damandriou Polichnitos
Metamorphosi Soteros Church in Papiana
Church of Agios Georgios Anemotia
Church of Agios Nikolaos Petra
Monastery of Ipsilou
Church of Agios Ioannis Kerami 
Church of Taxiarchon Vatousa

Administration
Lesbos is a separate regional unit of the North Aegean region, and since 2019 it consists of two municipalities: Mytilene and West Lesbos. Between the 2011 Kallikratis government reform and 2019, there was one single municipality on the island: Lesbos, created out of the 13 former municipalities on the island. At the same reform, the regional unit Lesbos was created out of part of the former Lesbos Prefecture.

The municipality of Mytilene consists of the following municipal units (former municipalities):
Agiasos (Αγιάσος)
Evergetoulas (Ευεργέτουλας)
Gera (Γέρα)
Loutropoli Thermis (Λουτρόπολη Θερμής)
Mytilene (Μυτιλήνη)
Plomari (Πλωμάρι)

The municipality of West Lesbos consists of the following municipal units:
Agia Paraskevi (Αγία Παρασκευή)
Eresos-Antissa (Ερεσός-Άντισσα)
Kalloni (Καλλονή)
Mantamados (Μανταμάδος)
Mithymna (Μήθυμνα)
Petra (Πέτρα)
Polichnitos (Πολίχνιτος)

Economy

The economy of Lesbos is essentially agricultural in nature, with olive oil being the main source of income. Tourism in Mytilene, encouraged by its international airport and the coastal towns of Petra, Plomari, Molyvos and Eresos, contribute substantially to the economy of the island. Fishing and the manufacture of soap and ouzo, the Greek national liqueur, are the remaining sources of income.

Migrants

Due to its proximity to the Turkish mainland, Lesbos is one of the Greek islands most affected by the European migrant crisis that started in 2015. Refugees of the Syrian Civil War came to the island in multiple vessels every day. As of June 2018, 8,000 refugees were trapped when a deal between Europe and Turkey removed their route to the continent in 2016. After that, living conditions deteriorated and the possibility for movement on to Europe dimmed. Moria Refugee Camp was the largest of the refugee camps and held twice as many people as it was designed to accommodate. By May 2020, Moria had 17,421 refugees living there.

On September 9, 2020, thousands of migrants fled from the overcrowded Moria camp, after a fire broke out. At least 25 firefighters, with 10 engines, were battling the flames both inside and outside the facility. A smaller-scale facility, the Pikpa camp catered for a segment of the refugee population until its closure in October 2020, whereupon the occupants were transferred to the "old" Kara Tepe Refugee Camp.

The Greek government maintains that the fires were started deliberately by migrants protesting that the camp had been put in lockdown due to a COVID-19 outbreak amongst the migrants in the camp. On September 16, 2020, four Afghan men were formally charged with arson for allegedly starting the fire. Two other migrants, both aged 17, which is below the age of full adult criminal responsibility in Greece, were also allegedly involved in starting the fire, and were held in police detention on the mainland.

After the closure of the Moria camp, a temporary facility was rapidly set up at Kara Tepe. The Greek government announced in November 2020 that a new closed reception centre will be built in the Vastria area near Nees Kydonies, on the border between Mytilene and Western Lesbos, and will be completed by late 2021.

Culture

Cuisine

Local specialities:
Chachles, type of tarhana
Kydonato, meat with quinces
Revithato, meat with chickpeas
Sardeles from Kalloni
Ladotyri Mytilinis, cheese
Selinato, meat with celery
Sfougato, omelette
Skafoudes, stuffed eggplants
Sougania, stuffed onions
Ouzo
Platseda (dessert)
Finikia (dessert)
Amygdalota 
Retseli

In popular culture
Films shot on the island include Daphnis and Chloe (1931) by Orestis Laskos, The tree under the sea (1985) by Philippe Muyl and One Love and the Other (1994) by Eva Bergman.
Lesbos is depicted in Assassin's Creed Odyssey as the northeasternmost Aegean Island, the center of the island is where the player's character can encounter Medusa.

Sports

The main football clubs in the island are Aiolikos F.C.,
Kalloni F.C. and
Sappho Lesvou F.C.

Media

Radio

TV
A regional television station operates from the city of Mytilene; Aeolos TV.

Newspapers
The main printed newspapers of the city are Empros, Ta Nea tis Lesvou, and Dimokratis. Online newspapers include Aeolos, Stonisi, Emprosnet, Lesvosnews, Lesvospost, and Kalloninews.

Notable residents

 Lesches (8th or 7th century BC), early poet
 Sappho (7th and 6th centuries BC), poet
 Terpander (7th century BC), poet and citharede
 Alcaeus of Mytilene (7th century BC), poet and politician
 Arion (7th century BC), poet
 Aristotle (384–322 BC), philosopher, was born in Chalkidike but lived for a time on the island.
 Theophrastus (370–285 BC), philosopher and botanist, successor to Aristotle 
 Theophanes of Mytilene (1st century BC), ancient Greek historian
 Longus (2nd century AD), ancient Greek author
 Theoctiste of Lesbos (9th century), hermit saint
 Constantine IX Monomachos: Byzantine emperor (1042–1055), resident of Mytilene prior to accession.
 Christopher of Mytilene (11th century), poet
 Doukas, Byzantine historian
 Hayreddin Barbarossa (1470s–1546), Ottoman admiral
 Georgios Jakobides (1853–1932), painter
 Gregorios Bernardakis (1848–1925), classical philologist and palaeographer
 Demetrios Bernardakis, dramatist
 Theophilos Hatzimihail (c. 1870–1934), painter
 Georgios Emmanouil Kaldis (1875–1953) lawyer, journalist and politician
 Tériade (1889–1983), art critic, patron, and publisher
 Hermon di Giovanno (c. 1900–1968), painter
 Odysseas Elytis (1911–1996), poet, Nobel Prize in Literature 1979
 Tzeli Hadjidimitriou (b. 1962), photographer and writer
 Stratis Myrivilis (1890–1969), writer
 Elias Venezis, writer
 Ahmed Djemal (1872–1922), Ottoman commander, politician
 Kostas Kenteris, athlete (running, 200 meters), Gold Olympic medal Sydney 2000, World and European championship gold medal
 Alex Martinez, graffiti artist, illustrator, muralist
 Hüseyin Hilmi Pasha (1 April 1855 – 1922), Grand Vizier of the Ottoman Empire
 Tamburi Ali Efendi (1836–1902), Turkish classical composer
 Steffen Streich, ultra-endurance cyclist

Gallery

See also 
 Adobogiona – an inscription in Lesbos honors this Celtic princess
 Aeolic Greek
 Assos
 Lesbian rule – historically a flexible lead mason's rule associated with Lesbos
 Lesbian wine
 List of islands of Greece
 List of traditional Greek place names
 University of the Aegean
 Ancient regions of Anatolia

References

External links 

  
 Lesvos News 
 Elstat 
  
 Guide of Lesbos Island 
 News of Mytilene and Lesvos Island 
 

Islands of Greece
Regional units of the North Aegean
Lesbianism
Global Geoparks Network members
Landforms of Lesbos
Islands of the North Aegean
Geoparks in Greece
Territories of the Republic of Genoa
Hellenic Navy bases
Populated places in Lesbos